The Men's points race event of the 2007 UCI Track Cycling World Championships was held on 31 March 2007.

Results

Qualifying

Heat 1

Heat 2

Final

References

External links
 Full results at Tissottiming.com

Men's points race
UCI Track Cycling World Championships – Men's points race